Indian Grinding Rock State Historic Park is a California State Park, preserving an outcropping of marbleized limestone with some 1,185 mortar holes—the largest collection of bedrock mortars in North America. The  park was established in 1962 and listed on the National Register of Historic Places in 1971.

The native name for the site is "Chaw’se", the Miwok word for "grinding rock". Upon this rock they ground acorns and other seeds into meal, slowly forming the cup-shaped depressions in the stone, which can still be seen today. Along with the mortar holes, the main grinding rock within the park features a number of petroglyphs: circles, spoked wheels, animal and human tracks, wavy lines, etc. Some of these carvings are thought to be as much as two or three thousand years old and are now becoming difficult to discern. This association of rock art and bedrock mortar pits is unique in California. Except for one other small site, Chaw'se has the only known occurrence of mortars intentionally decorated with petroglyphs.

Chaw'se Regional Indian Museum
This museum within the park grounds features a variety of exhibits and a vast collection of Sierra Nevada Indian artifacts. A Miwok village complete with a ceremonial roundhouse has been reconstructed in the middle of the small valley and is registered as California Historical Landmark #1001. The museum has been designed to reflect the architecture of the traditional roundhouse. Exhibited in this two-story museum are examples of the technology and crafts of the Miwok and other Sierra Nevada Native American groups. As a regional Indian museum, the collection at Chaw'se includes exhibits on various tribal groups, including: the Northern, Central and Southern Miwok, Maidu, Konkow, Monache, Nisenan, Tubatulabal, Washoe, and Foothill Yokuts.

Wildlife
Bird life varies depending on the season, but many species are seen year-round, including turkey vultures, California scrub and Steller's jays, California quail, acorn and hairy woodpeckers, northern flickers, hermit thrushes, wild turkeys (non-native), and California thrashers. In summer the bright colors of the western tanager, northern oriole, calliope and Anna's hummingbirds can be seen in the woods around the meadow.

Animal life in and around the park includes deer, fox, gray and California ground squirrels, black-tailed jackrabbits, bobcats, bats, and occasionally a mountain lion or black bear. Coyote calls can be heard on quiet summer nights.

See also
List of California state parks

References

This article contains material from the California Department of Parks and Recreation which, unless otherwise indicated, is in the public domain.

External links 

Official Indian Grinding Rock State Historic Park website

California State Historic Parks
Miwok
Museums in Amador County, California
Native American museums in California
Parks in Amador County, California
Protected areas of the Sierra Nevada (United States)
Archaeological sites on the National Register of Historic Places in California
Native American history of California
California Historical Landmarks
1962 establishments in California
Protected areas established in 1962
National Register of Historic Places in Amador County, California